The 1959–60 New York Rangers season was the franchise's 34th season. In the regular season, the Rangers had a 17–38–15 record, and finished with 49 points. Their last-place finish caused them to miss the NHL playoffs.

Regular season

Final standings

Record vs. opponents

Schedule and results

|- align="center" bgcolor="#FFBBBB"
| 1 || 7 || @ Chicago Black Hawks || 5–2 || 0–1–0
|- align="center" bgcolor="#FFBBBB"
| 2 || 10 || @ Boston Bruins || 6–4 || 0–2–0
|- align="center" bgcolor="#FFBBBB"
| 3 || 11 || @ Detroit Red Wings || 4–2 || 0–3–0
|- align="center" bgcolor="#FFBBBB"
| 4 || 14 || Boston Bruins || 4–3 || 0–4–0
|- align="center" bgcolor="#CCFFCC"
| 5 || 17 || @ Montreal Canadiens || 4–2 || 1–4–0
|- align="center" bgcolor="#FFBBBB"
| 6 || 18 || Montreal Canadiens || 6–5 || 1–5–0
|- align="center" bgcolor="#FFBBBB"
| 7 || 21 || Toronto Maple Leafs || 3–2 || 1–6–0
|- align="center" bgcolor="white"
| 8 || 24 || @ Toronto Maple Leafs || 1–1 || 1–6–1
|- align="center" bgcolor="#CCFFCC"
| 9 || 25 || Chicago Black Hawks || 3–1 || 2–6–1
|- align="center" bgcolor="white"
| 10 || 28 || Detroit Red Wings || 3–3 || 2–6–2
|-

|- align="center" bgcolor="#FFBBBB"
| 11 || 1 || Montreal Canadiens || 3–1 || 2–7–2
|- align="center" bgcolor="#FFBBBB"
| 12 || 4 || @ Toronto Maple Leafs || 4–1 || 2–8–2
|- align="center" bgcolor="#FFBBBB"
| 13 || 5 || @ Montreal Canadiens || 8–2 || 2–9–2
|- align="center" bgcolor="white"
| 14 || 8 || @ Detroit Red Wings || 3–3 || 2–9–3
|- align="center" bgcolor="#CCFFCC"
| 15 || 11 || Boston Bruins || 6–3 || 3–9–3
|- align="center" bgcolor="#FFBBBB"
| 16 || 14 || Detroit Red Wings || 4–0 || 3–10–3
|- align="center" bgcolor="white"
| 17 || 15 || Toronto Maple Leafs || 2–2 || 3–10–4
|- align="center" bgcolor="#FFBBBB"
| 18 || 18 || @ Chicago Black Hawks || 5–3 || 3–11–4
|- align="center" bgcolor="#FFBBBB"
| 19 || 22 || Detroit Red Wings || 5–3 || 3–12–4
|- align="center" bgcolor="white"
| 20 || 25 || Boston Bruins || 3–3 || 3–12–5
|- align="center" bgcolor="#FFBBBB"
| 21 || 26 || @ Boston Bruins || 4–3 || 3–13–5
|- align="center" bgcolor="#FFBBBB"
| 22 || 28 || @ Chicago Black Hawks || 6–2 || 3–14–5
|- align="center" bgcolor="white"
| 23 || 29 || Chicago Black Hawks || 2–2 || 3–14–6
|-

|- align="center" bgcolor="#CCFFCC"
| 24 || 3 || @ Montreal Canadiens || 7–4 || 4–14–6
|- align="center" bgcolor="#FFBBBB"
| 25 || 5 || @ Toronto Maple Leafs || 6–3 || 4–15–6
|- align="center" bgcolor="#CCFFCC"
| 26 || 6 || Toronto Maple Leafs || 6–0 || 5–15–6
|- align="center" bgcolor="#CCFFCC"
| 27 || 12 || @ Boston Bruins || 4–3 || 6–15–6
|- align="center" bgcolor="#CCFFCC"
| 28 || 13 || Boston Bruins || 4–3 || 7–15–6
|- align="center" bgcolor="#FFBBBB"
| 29 || 19 || @ Montreal Canadiens || 5–3 || 7–16–6
|- align="center" bgcolor="#CCFFCC"
| 30 || 20 || Montreal Canadiens || 6–5 || 8–16–6
|- align="center" bgcolor="#FFBBBB"
| 31 || 23 || Chicago Black Hawks || 3–0 || 8–17–6
|- align="center" bgcolor="#CCFFCC"
| 32 || 25 || @ Detroit Red Wings || 5–2 || 9–17–6
|- align="center" bgcolor="#FFBBBB"
| 33 || 26 || @ Toronto Maple Leafs || 4–0 || 9–18–6
|- align="center" bgcolor="#FFBBBB"
| 34 || 27 || Toronto Maple Leafs || 6–3 || 9–19–6
|- align="center" bgcolor="#FFBBBB"
| 35 || 29 || Boston Bruins || 4–3 || 9–20–6
|-

|- align="center" bgcolor="#FFBBBB"
| 36 || 1 || @ Boston Bruins || 7–3 || 9–21–6
|- align="center" bgcolor="#CCFFCC"
| 37 || 3 || Montreal Canadiens || 8–3 || 10–21–6
|- align="center" bgcolor="#FFBBBB"
| 38 || 6 || Chicago Black Hawks || 2–1 || 10–22–6
|- align="center" bgcolor="white"
| 39 || 9 || Detroit Red Wings || 3–3 || 10–22–7
|- align="center" bgcolor="#CCFFCC"
| 40 || 10 || @ Detroit Red Wings || 4–3 || 11–22–7
|- align="center" bgcolor="#FFBBBB"
| 41 || 14 || @ Boston Bruins || 6–0 || 11–23–7
|- align="center" bgcolor="#FFBBBB"
| 42 || 16 || @ Toronto Maple Leafs || 3–1 || 11–24–7
|- align="center" bgcolor="#FFBBBB"
| 43 || 17 || @ Chicago Black Hawks || 3–1 || 11–25–7
|- align="center" bgcolor="#FFBBBB"
| 44 || 21 || @ Montreal Canadiens || 11–2 || 11–26–7
|- align="center" bgcolor="#FFBBBB"
| 45 || 23 || @ Chicago Black Hawks || 2–1 || 11–27–7
|- align="center" bgcolor="white"
| 46 || 24 || @ Detroit Red Wings || 2–2 || 11–27–8
|- align="center" bgcolor="white"
| 47 || 27 || Montreal Canadiens || 2–2 || 11–27–9
|- align="center" bgcolor="#FFBBBB"
| 48 || 30 || @ Toronto Maple Leafs || 3–2 || 11–28–9
|- align="center" bgcolor="white"
| 49 || 31 || Detroit Red Wings || 3–3 || 11–28–10
|-

|- align="center" bgcolor="#FFBBBB"
| 50 || 3 || Toronto Maple Leafs || 4–2 || 11–29–10
|- align="center" bgcolor="#CCFFCC"
| 51 || 4 || @ Detroit Red Wings || 3–1 || 12–29–10
|- align="center" bgcolor="#FFBBBB"
| 52 || 6 || Chicago Black Hawks || 5–1 || 12–30–10
|- align="center" bgcolor="#CCFFCC"
| 53 || 7 || Montreal Canadiens || 4–1 || 13–30–10
|- align="center" bgcolor="#FFBBBB"
| 54 || 10 || @ Chicago Black Hawks || 5–1 || 13–31–10
|- align="center" bgcolor="#FFBBBB"
| 55 || 14 || @ Boston Bruins || 3–0 || 13–32–10
|- align="center" bgcolor="#FFBBBB"
| 56 || 17 || Chicago Black Hawks || 5–1 || 13–33–10
|- align="center" bgcolor="white"
| 57 || 20 || @ Montreal Canadiens || 3–3 || 13–33–11
|- align="center" bgcolor="#CCFFCC"
| 58 || 21 || Boston Bruins || 7–2 || 14–33–11
|- align="center" bgcolor="white"
| 59 || 24 || Detroit Red Wings || 2–2 || 14–33–12
|- align="center" bgcolor="#FFBBBB"
| 60 || 27 || @ Montreal Canadiens || 3–2 || 14–34–12
|- align="center" bgcolor="#FFBBBB"
| 61 || 28 || Toronto Maple Leafs || 5–3 || 14–35–12
|-

|- align="center" bgcolor="#FFBBBB"
| 62 || 5 || @ Chicago Black Hawks || 5–0 || 14–36–12
|- align="center" bgcolor="#CCFFCC"
| 63 || 6 || Detroit Red Wings || 3–1 || 15–36–12
|- align="center" bgcolor="white"
| 64 || 9 || Chicago Black Hawks || 1–1 || 15–36–13
|- align="center" bgcolor="white"
| 65 || 10 || @ Boston Bruins || 3–3 || 15–36–14
|- align="center" bgcolor="#CCFFCC"
| 66 || 12 || @ Toronto Maple Leafs || 4–1 || 16–36–14
|- align="center" bgcolor="white"
| 67 || 13 || Toronto Maple Leafs || 2–2 || 16–36–15
|- align="center" bgcolor="#FFBBBB"
| 68 || 16 || Boston Bruins || 3–2 || 16–37–15
|- align="center" bgcolor="#FFBBBB"
| 69 || 19 || @ Detroit Red Wings || 6–3 || 16–38–15
|- align="center" bgcolor="#CCFFCC"
| 70 || 20 || Montreal Canadiens || 3–1 || 17–38–15
|-

Playoffs
The Rangers finished in last place in the NHL and failed to qualify for the 1960 Stanley Cup playoffs.

Player statistics
Skaters

Goaltenders

†Denotes player spent time with another team before joining Rangers. Stats reflect time with Rangers only.
‡Traded mid-season. Stats reflect time with Rangers only.

Awards and records

Dean Prentice, left wing, NHL second All-Star team

See also
1959–60 NHL season

References

External links
1959–60 New York Rangers Statistics

New York Rangers seasons
New York Rangers
New York Rangers
New York Rangers
New York Rangers
1950s in Manhattan
1960s in Manhattan
Madison Square Garden